Vello Vinn (born 4 October 1939) is an Estonian printmaker.

Life and work
Vello Vinn was born in Sõrve, Saaremaa on 4 October 1939. He studied English philology at the University of Tartu in 1959 to 1962, and art in the Estonian Academy of Arts from 1963 to 1968 where he graduated in the field of glass art.  In 1968 he promptly ditched glass for print. His specialty became etching and drypoint. In the nineties he participated in the Estonian 'PARA'-Surrealist movement (Eller 1996; Kaevats 1998; Helme and Kangilaski 1999). The works of Vello Vinn form a noteworthy example of the oeuvre of an Estonian printmaker from the late 1960s and early 1970s, and they boast a holistic and emphatically unique image system. Vinn’s highly original visual world is grounded in his mastery of various printmaking techniques, delicate treatment of images and witty associations. The artist’s play with space and images, 
his ability to notice details and different levels of meaning and to put together a new whole out of these details offer the public a unique viewing experience. Besides playful images, Vinn’s prints often present witty wordplay and warm absurd humour, which invite viewers to join in the artist’s thought and creative processes (Taidre 2020).

Solo exhibitions
This is only a partial listing.
 Tallinn (Estonia) 1970,1977, 1984,1989,1992, 1994,1996,1996, 2006, 2009, 2011, 2014, 2019, 2020
 Kuressaare (Estonia) 1980, 1995
 Rapla (Estonia) 1983
 Vilnius (Lithuania) 1985
 Helsinki (Finland) 1987
 Brandenburg (Germany) 1989
 Paldiski (Estonia) 1997–98
 Frederikshavn (Denmark) 2012

Awards
 Prix d`Emona IX Ljubljana Biennial of Graphic Arts, 1971
 Diploma II Tallinn Print Triennial, 1971
 Special prize V ja VII Tallinn Print Triennial, 1980, 1986
 Special prize, Vilnius Biennale of Exlibris 1979,1981,1983, diploma 1993
 Diploma, I Miniature Prints Triennal in Riga 1983
 Special prize II Artist's Book Triennial Vilnius 1984
 Main prize V Vilnius Biennale of Exlibris 1985
 Gold Point Uzice V International Graphic Art Biennale, Dry Point, Uzice (Yugoslavia), 2001
 Gold Point Uzice VI International Graphic Art Biennale, Dry Point, Uzice (Serbia and Montenegro), 2003
 Kristjan Raud Prize, Tallinn, 2015
 Lifetime achievement award from the Cultural Endowment of Estonia, Tallinn, 2021

Gallery

References

Sources
 Eller, M.-I. 1996. Bibliographic lexicon of Estonian Art and Architecture. Tallinn, p. 594-595.
 Kaevats, Ü. 1998. Estonian Encyclopedia 10. Tallinn, Entsüklopeedia Kirjastus, p. 445.
 Helme, S. and Kangilaski, J. 1999. Short history of Estonian art. Tallinn, p. 188,204,206.
 Taidre, E. (ed.). 2020. Vello Vinn. Eesti Kunstimuuseum, Tallinn, 224 pp.

Further reading
 Taidre, E. (ed.). 2020. Vello Vinn. Eesti Kunstimuuseum, Tallinn, 224 pp.

External links
  Vello Vinn in Art Museum of Estonia
 
 
 
 

1939 births
Living people
People from Saaremaa Parish
20th-century Estonian male artists
21st-century Estonian male artists
Graphic artists
Estonian Academy of Arts alumni